La indomable, is a Venezuelan telenovela written by Inés Rodena and adapted by Ana Mercedes Escámez for Radio Caracas Televisión  in 1974. It starred Marina Baura and Elio Rubens.

A new version of this soap opera entitled Alma indomable was made in 2010.

Plot 
María de la Cruz (Maricruz) Olivares is humble girl who lives in the countryside with her grandparents and sister. Despite their poverty, they are extremely happy. One day the handsome Aviator Octavio Narváez meets and falls for her. Octavio, known for Maricruz, feels love and compassion for their poverty and illiteracy, but her sister-in-law, the terrible and evil Lucía Santibáñez de Narváez, hates her.

Cast 
Marina Baura as Maricruz
Elio Rubens as Octavio Narváez
Mario Santa Cruz as Abuelo
Martha Olivo as Santa
Paula D'Arco as Sofía
Bárbara Teyde as Lucía Narváez
Carlos Marquéz as Porfirio
Marisela Berti as Lucy
Manolo Coego as Maraja de Capultana
Wendy Torres as Violeta

Other versions
La venganza - First remake made in Mexico in 1977, starring Helena Rojo and Enrique Lizalde.
Rosa salvaje - 1987 remake made in Mexico, starring Verónica Castro and Guillermo Capetillo.
Marimar - Second remake made in Mexico in 1994, starring Thalía and Eduardo Capetillo.
Abrázame muy fuerte - 2000 remake made in Mexico, starring Victoria Ruffo, Aracely Arámbula, and Fernando Colunga.
Gata Salvaje - 2002 remake made in Venezuela, starring Marlene Favela and Mario Cimarro. 
MariMar - Third remake made in the Philippines in 2007 by GMA 7, starring Marian Rivera and Dingdong Dantes.
Tormenta en el paraíso - Third remake made in Mexico in 2007, starring  Sara Maldonado and Erick Elías.
Alma Indomable - Third remake made in Venezuela in 2010, starring Scarlet Ortiz and Jose Angel Llamas.
Corazón indomable - Fourth remake made in Mexico in 2013, starring Ana Brenda Contreras and Daniel Arenas.
Que te perdone Dios - 2015 remake made in Mexico, starring Rebecca Jones, Zuria Vega, Mark Tacher and Sergio Goyri.
MariMar - Fourth remake made in the Philippines in 2015 by GMA 7, starring Megan Young and Tom Rodriguez.

References

External links 

1974 telenovelas
RCTV telenovelas
Spanish-language telenovelas
Venezuelan telenovelas